Ravil Nezamovich Khabutdinov (15 December 1928 – 1 November 1997) was a weightlifter from Russia. He started training in weightlifting in 1948 while serving in the Soviet Army. In 1956 he finished third at the national championships, but was selected for the national team and won silver medals at the 1956 Summer Olympics and European championships, both times behind Ihor Rybak. Next year, in absence of Rybak, he won the European and national lightweight titles and retired from competitions. During his career Khabutdinov set seven ratified world records in press, six in the lightweight class and one in the middleweight category.

References

1928 births
1997 deaths
Soviet male weightlifters
Weightlifters at the 1956 Summer Olympics
Olympic weightlifters of the Soviet Union
Olympic silver medalists for the Soviet Union
Olympic medalists in weightlifting
Medalists at the 1956 Summer Olympics
European Weightlifting Championships medalists